SM UB-86 was a German Type UB III submarine or U-boat in the German Imperial Navy during World War I. She was commissioned into the German Imperial Navy on 31 October 1917 as SM UB-86.

UB-86 was surrendered to the Allies at Harwich on 24 November 1918 in accordance with the requirements of the Armistice with Germany. After passing into British hands, UB-86 was towed to Falmouth along with five other U-boats  for use in a series of explosive test trials by the Royal Navy in Falmouth Bay, in order to find weaknesses in their design. Following her use on 14 January 1921, UB-86 was dumped on Castle Beach and sold to R. Roskelly & Rodgers on 19 April 1921 for scrap (for £110), and partially salvaged over the following decades, although parts remain in situ.

Construction

UB-85 was ordered on 23 September 1916.
She was built by AG Weser of Bremen and following just under a year of construction, launched at Bremen on 10 October 1917. UB-86 was commissioned later that same year under the command of Kptlt. Hans Trenk. Like all Type UB III submarines, UB-86 carried 10 torpedoes and was armed with a  deck gun. UB-86 had a displacement of  while surfaced and  when submerged. Her engines enabled her to travel at  when surfaced and  when submerged.

Service history
On 17 August 1918 UB-86 torpedoed the cargo steam ship   N by W from Gurnard Head near St Ives, Cornwall. Denebola, en route from Swansea bound for Rouen, was struck by two torpedoes which hit near number two and three holds causing her to sink rapidly. The crew took to a boat and a raft and were later picked up by a patrol vessel. The second engineer and one able seaman were lost.

Summary of raiding history

References

Notes

Citations

Bibliography 

 

German Type UB III submarines
World War I submarines of Germany
U-boats commissioned in 1917
1917 ships
Ships built in Bremen (state)